Easy! is a 2011 Italian comedy film directed by Francesco Bruni.

Cast

 Fabrizio Bentivoglio as Bruno
 Filippo Scicchitano as Luca
 Barbora Bobuľová as Tina
 Vinicio Marchioni as Il Poeta
 Stefano Brunori as Stefano
 Franco Campiti as Franco
 Giacomo Ceccarelli as Valerio
 Paola Tiziana Cruciani as Giovanna
 Adamo Dionisi as Il piccoletto
 Giuseppe Guarino as Carmelo
 Raffaella Lebboroni as Professor Di Biagio
 Natascia Macchniz as Segretaria liceo

Plot
A retired teacher and novelist (Bruno), who survives by private tutoring, is currently writing the biography for former adult star (Tina). He then discovers that one of his students (Luca), a teenager who is on the brink of failure at school, is actually his son.

Music
The twelve tracks of the original soundtrack were produced by  The Ceasars and sung by the Italian rapper Amir Issaa, then  published by EMI Music Publishing Italy.  The official videoclip of the film, directed by Gianluca Catania, won the 2012 Roma Videoclip Award. The Ceasars and Amir were nominated for the 2012 David di Donatello Award and Nastro d'Argento (silver ribbons) for the song “Scialla” and won the 2012 “Premio Cinema Giovane” for the best original soundtrack.

Tracks
 FRancesco Rigon – Le onde
 Amir – La parte del figlio
 Amir – Scialla
 FRancesco Rigon – Mr. Slide
 Amir – Questa è Roma
 Ceasar & PStarr – Pool party
 Ceasar Productions – Macchina gialla
 Amir – La strada parla
 Ceasar & PStarr – Discoteque
 Ceasar & PStarr – Scialla variazioni sul tema
 FRancesco Rigon – Il gatto e la pioggia
 Amir – Le ali per volare

References

External links
 

2011 films
2011 comedy films
Italian comedy films
2010s Italian-language films
Films set in Rome
2010s Italian films